Maneater is a 2009 direct-to-video natural horror film directed by Michael Emanuel and starring Dean Cain, Lacy Phillips, Stephen Lunsford, Christopher Darga, Nicole Moore, Allison Kyler, Conrad Janis, Robert R. Shafer, Shea Curry and Bobby Ray Shafer.

Plot
A former FBI profiler, now a sheriff of a small town and single parent of a high school-aged daughter, begins to profile a series of unexplained murders only to find out that the monster he's profiling may be himself.

Cast

Production
Dean Cain narrated the film at 2009 Shriekfest Film Festival, which ran from 1 October between 4th, 2009 in Los Angeles.

References

External links
 

2009 direct-to-video films
2009 films
American natural horror films
American science fiction horror films
2000s science fiction horror films
2000s English-language films
2000s American films